A French legislative election took place on 25 May and 1 June 1997 to elect the 11th National Assembly of the French Fifth Republic.  It was the consequence of President Jacques Chirac's decision to call the legislative election one year before the deadline.

In March 1993, the right won a large victory in the legislative election and a comfortable parliamentary majority. Two years later, the RPR leader Jacques Chirac was elected President of France promising to reduce the "social fracture". However, the programme of welfare reforms ("Plan Juppé") proposed by his Prime Minister Alain Juppé caused a social crisis in November and December 1995. The popularity of the executive duo decreased.

In spring 1997, President Chirac tried to take the left-wing opposition by surprise by dissolving the National Assembly. The first opinion polls indicated a re-election of the right-wing majority. The "Plural Left" coalition, composed of the Socialists, the Communists, the Greens, the Citizens' Movement, and the Left Radicals, proposed a program of social reforms to reduce unemployment and legislation to limit the length of the work week to 35 hours. Prime Minister Juppé's unpopularity, as well as the unpopularity of his government's policies, contributed to the left's triumph.

In the first round, the left-wing coalition obtained more votes than the incumbent parliamentary majority. After he was blamed for the situation, Juppé announced he would resign even if the right kept their majority in the runoff vote. For all that, the "Plural left" obtained the majority of the seats; however the Socialists needed its allies to form a majority. For the first time, the ecologists were represented in the Parliament. The participation of the National Front's candidates in the second round increased the defeat of the presidential majority.

This was the first time since 1877 that a President of France lost a legislative election that he had called. The Socialist leader Lionel Jospin became Prime Minister of the third cohabitation. It finished with the 2002 French presidential election, which Jospin unexpectedly lost in the first round, causing his retirement from politics.

Results

|-
! style="background-color:#E9E9E9;text-align:left;vertical-align:top;" rowspan=2 colspan=3 |Parties and coalitions
! style="background-color:#E9E9E9;text-align:center;" colspan=2 |1st round
! style="background-color:#E9E9E9;text-align:center;" colspan=2 |2nd round
! style="background-color:#E9E9E9" rowspan=2|Total seats
|-
! style="background-color:#E9E9E9;text-align:right;" |Votes
! style="background-color:#E9E9E9;text-align:right;" |%
! style="background-color:#E9E9E9;text-align:right;" |Votes
! style="background-color:#E9E9E9;text-align:right;" |%
|-
| style="background-color:;" | 
| style="text-align:left;" | Socialist Party
| style="text-align:right;" | PS
| style="text-align:right;" | 5,977,045
| style="text-align:right;" | 23.49
| style="text-align:right;" | 9,722,022
| style="text-align:right;" | 38.20
| style="text-align:right;" | 255
|-
| style="background-color:;" |
| style="text-align:left;" | French Communist Party
| style="text-align:right;" | PCF
| style="text-align:right;" | 2,523,405
| style="text-align:right;" | 9.92
| style="text-align:right;" | 921,716
| style="text-align:right;" | 3.62
| style="text-align:right;" | 35
|-
| style="background-color:;" |
| style="text-align:left;" | The Greens
| style="text-align:right;" | LV
| style="text-align:right;" | 1,738,287
| style="text-align:right;" | 6.83
| style="text-align:right;" | 414,871
| style="text-align:right;" | 1.63
| style="text-align:right;" | 7
|-
| style="background-color:;" |
| style="text-align:left;" | Miscellaneous Left
| style="text-align:right;" | DVG
| style="text-align:right;" | 713,082
| style="text-align:right;" | 2.80
| style="text-align:right;" | 543,789
| style="text-align:right;" | 2.14
| style="text-align:right;" | 4
|-
| style="background-color:;" |
| style="text-align:left;" | Radical-Socialist Party
| style="text-align:right;" | PRS
| style="text-align:right;" | 389,782
| style="text-align:right;" | 1.53
| style="text-align:right;" | 558,959
| style="text-align:right;" | 2.20
| style="text-align:right;" | 12
|-
| style="background-color:;" |
| style="text-align:left;" | Citizens' Movement
| style="text-align:right;" | MDC
| style="text-align:right;" | 263,490
| style="text-align:right;" | 1.04
| style="text-align:right;" | see DVG
| style="text-align:right;" | see DVG
| style="text-align:right;" | 7
|- style="background-color:pink"
| style="text-align:left;" colspan=2| Total "Plural Left"
|
| style="text-align:right;" | 11,605,091
| style="text-align:right;" | 45.61
| style="text-align:right;" | 12,161,357
| style="text-align:right;" | 47.79
| style="text-align:right;" | 320
|-
| style="background-color:;" |
| style="text-align:left;" | Rally for the Republic
| style="text-align:right;" | RPR
| style="text-align:right;" | 3,983,257
| style="text-align:right;" | 15.65
| style="text-align:right;" | 5,714,354
| style="text-align:right;" | 22.46
| style="text-align:right;" | 139
|-
| style="background-color:;" |
| style="text-align:left;" | Union for French Democracy
| style="text-align:right;" | UDF
| style="text-align:right;" | 3,617,440
| style="text-align:right;" | 14.22
| style="text-align:right;" | 5,284,203
| style="text-align:right;" | 20.07
| style="text-align:right;" | 112
|-
| style="background-color:;" |
| style="text-align:left;" | Miscellaneous Right
| style="text-align:right;" | DVD
| style="text-align:right;" | 1,073,014
| style="text-align:right;" | 4.22
| style="text-align:right;" | 594,862
| style="text-align:right;" | 2.34
| style="text-align:right;" | 0
|-
| style="background-color:;" |
| style="text-align:left;" | The Independent Right
| style="text-align:right;" | LDI
| style="text-align:right;" | 606,355
| style="text-align:right;" | 2.38
| style="text-align:right;" | see DVD
| style="text-align:right;" | see DVD
| style="text-align:right;" | 2
|- style="background-color:lightblue"
| style="text-align:left;" colspan=2|Total "Presidential Majority" (Right)
|
| style="text-align:right;" | 9,280,066
| style="text-align:right;" | 36.50
| style="text-align:right;" | 11,593,419
| style="text-align:right;" | 46.02
| style="text-align:right;" | 253
|-
| style="background-color:;" |
| style="text-align:left;" | National Front
| style="text-align:right;" | FN
| style="text-align:right;" | 3,800,785
| style="text-align:right;" | 14.94
| style="text-align:right;" | 1,434,854
| style="text-align:right;" | 5.64
| style="text-align:right;" | 1
|-
| style="background-color:;" |
| style="text-align:left;" | Far-Left
|
| style="text-align:right;" | 644,051
| style="text-align:right;" | 2.53
| style="text-align:right;" | -
| style="text-align:right;" | -
| style="text-align:right;" | 0
|-
| style="background-color:;" |
| style="text-align:left;" | Miscellaneous
|
| style="text-align:right;" | 354,249
| style="text-align:right;" | 1.39
| style="text-align:right;" | ?
| style="text-align:right;" | ?
| style="text-align:right;" | 3
|-
| style="background-color:;" |
| style="text-align:left;" | Others Far-Right
|
| style="text-align:right;" | 26,759
| style="text-align:right;" | 0.11
| style="text-align:right;" | -
| style="text-align:right;" | -
| style="text-align:right;" | 0
|-
|
| style="text-align:left;" | Total
|
| style="text-align:right;" | 25,423,790
| style="text-align:right;" | 100.00
| style="text-align:right;" | 25,189,630
| style="text-align:right;" | 100.00
| style="text-align:right;" | 577
|-
| style="text-align:left;" colspan=8 | Abstention: 32.09% (1st round); 28.48% (2nd round)
|}

11th Assembly by Parliamentary Group

1997
1997 elections in France
May 1997 events in Europe
June 1997 events in Europe